Rotherham Town F.C. was the name of two football clubs:
Rotherham Town F.C. (1878), a member of the Football League 1893-1896
Rotherham Town F.C. (1899), merged with Rotherham County F.C. to form Rotherham United F.C.